Thomson Joseph Skinner (May 24, 1752 – January 20, 1809) was an American politician from Williamstown, Massachusetts.  In addition to service as a militia officer during the American Revolution, he served as a county judge and sheriff, member of both houses of the Massachusetts legislature, U.S. Marshal, and member of the United States House of Representatives.  He served for two years as Treasurer and Receiver-General of Massachusetts, and after his death an audit showed his accounts to be deficient for more than the value of his estate, which led to those who had posted bonds on his behalf having to pay the debt.

Early life
Thomson J. Skinner was born in Colchester in the Connecticut Colony on May 24, 1752, the son of Reverend Thomas Skinner and Mary Thomson, the second wife of Thomas Skinner.  (His name is sometimes spelled Thompson, Tompson, Tomson, or even Thomas.)  Skinner was educated in Colchester, his father died when he was 10 years old, and Thomson Skinner and his brother Benjamin were apprenticed to a carpenter and homebuilder.  At age 21 Skinner moved to Williamstown, Massachusetts with his brother, where they went into the construction business as partners in a firm they named "T. J. and B. Skinner".  The Skinner brothers were also involved in other ventures, including a successful tavern.

Military career
Thomson Skinner was a member of the militia, including service during and after the American Revolution.  In the summer of 1776 he carried messages between units in Berkshire County and General Horatio Gates, commander of the Continental Army's Northern Department in upstate New York.  He also served as adjutant of Berkshire County's 2nd Regiment, adjutant of the Berkshire County 3rd Regiment (Simonds'), and a company commander in the Berkshire County regiment commanded by Asa Barnes. Skinner remained in the militia after the war, and rose to the rank of major general.  During the Revolution he served as a member of the court-martial which acquitted Paul Revere's conduct during the unsuccessful Penobscot Expedition.

Political career
He served in the Massachusetts House of Representatives in 1781, 1785, 1789, and 1800.  He was a member of the Massachusetts State Senate from 1786 to 1788, 1790 to 1797, and 1801 to 1803.

From 1788 to 1807 he was a Judge of the Court of Common Pleas for Berkshire County, and he was chief judge from 1795 to 1807.  In 1788 he was a delegate to the state convention that ratified the United States Constitution, and voted in favor of ratification.

From 1791 to 1792 he served as Berkshire County Sheriff.  In 1792 Skinner, recognized as a Federalist, was a presidential elector, and supported the reelection of George Washington and John Adams.  Skinner was a founding trustee of Williams College, served on the board of trustees from 1793 to 1809, and was treasurer from 1793 to 1798.

Skinner represented Massachusetts's 1st congressional district (Berkshire County) in the U.S. House for part of one term and all of another, January 1797 to March 1799.  He was again elected to the U.S. House in 1802, this time from the renumbered 12th District, and served from March 1803 until resigning in August 1804.  Skinner, by now identified with the Jeffersonian or Democratic-Republican Party, lost to John Quincy Adams, the Federalist candidate, in an 1803 election for U.S. Senator.

From 1804 to 1807 Skinner served as U.S. Marshal for Massachusetts.  From 1806 to 1808 he was Treasurer and Receiver-General of Massachusetts.

Death
Skinner died in Boston on January 20, 1809.

Accounts as Massachusetts Treasurer
After Skinner's death, an 1809 audit revealed that his accounts as state treasurer were in arrears for $60,000 (about $935,000 in 2017), while his estate was valued at only $20,000.  Several of the individuals who had posted surety bonds to guarantee his performance as treasurer paid portions of the remaining $40,000 obligation in order to satisfy Skinner's debt.

Family
In 1773 Skinner married Ann Foote (April 11, 1754 – December 15, 1808).  Their children included Thomson Joseph, Mary, Thomas, Ann, Eliza, and George Denison.  Skinner and his wife had known each other as children because Skinner's mother had married Ann Foote's father following the deaths of Skinner's father and Foote's mother.

References

External links

1752 births
1809 deaths
Massachusetts militiamen in the American Revolution
American militia generals
Massachusetts state senators
Massachusetts state court judges
Massachusetts sheriffs
Members of the Massachusetts House of Representatives
State treasurers of Massachusetts
Massachusetts Federalists
People from Colchester, Connecticut
People from Williamstown, Massachusetts
Democratic-Republican Party members of the United States House of Representatives from Massachusetts